Pantoate kinase (PoK, TK2141 protein) is an enzyme with systematic name ATP:(R)-pantoate 4-phosphotransferase. This enzyme catalyses the following chemical reaction

 ATP + (R)-pantoate  ADP + (R)-4-phosphopantoate

The conversion of (R)-pantoate to (R)-4'-phosphopantothenate is done during biosynthesis of 4'-phosphopantetheine,.

References

External links 
 

EC 2.7.1